Golborne South railway station was one of two stations serving the town of Golborne, to the south of Wigan.

The early line and station to 1849

On the L&MR intermediate stopping places were neither advertised nor provided with facilities, they were mostly situated at level crossings where a policeman or gateman was permanently on duty, passengers wishing to use the stopping place informed the staff who signalled the requirement to stop to the train crew, 

The WBR had one crossing on the level, at Golborne,  from Parkside, where the Warrington to Wigan turnpike crossed the railway at a gated level crossing known as Golborne Gates and this would have been an identified stopping place on the line and therefore may have operated as a station in the same way as on the L&MR. A more formal station was probably opened as Golborne Gate or Gates by the North Union Railway (NUR) probably sometime before 1839 as the station started to appear on the maps in Bradshaw from then, fares to intermediate stations, including Golbourne Gate [sic] were published in 1839. By 1847 the station was known as Golborne and it appeared in Bradshaw in a route-table with times for the trains shown. As late as 1849 the OS map shows the level crossing but no station or structure.

From 1 January 1846 the NUR was leased jointly by the Grand Junction Railway (GJR) and the Manchester and Leeds Railway (M&LR). Later in 1846 the leases passed, by amalgamation from the GJR to the London and North Western Railway (L&NWR) and from the M&LR to the Lancashire and Yorkshire Railway.

L&NWR from 1850
The L&NWR replaced the level crossing with a road overbridge carrying High Street/Church Road (which became the A573), on a slightly further north alignment sometime around 1867-68. The station was rebuilt sometime between the new road being completed and the OS map being issued in 1893. The station was built on the original lines of the WBR which became the slow lines when the line was quadrupled, the fast lines by-passed the station to the east. The station building was on the east side platform, to the south of the road overbridge which crossed the platforms about half-way along their length. The building was a two-storey brick-built building accessed from the bridge with the booking hall at road level, steps went down to each platform, the west-side platform steps descending from a pedestrian bridge crossing the lines. There was a brick built shelter on each platform.

During the late 1800s more railways opened and traffic increased. The line through Golborne, as part of the main western trunk route to Scotland, became congested and between 1888 and 1894 the lines through the station site were quadrupled.

There were two signal boxes in the station vicinity one to the south west of the running lines that controlled the goods yard, and one to the north of the eastern platform, between the slow and fast lines, which controlled access to Golborne Colliery. The goods yard had two, later three sidings on the west side of the running lines and a warehouse, it was able to accommodate most types of goods including live stock and was equipped with a five ton crane.

In 1922 thirteen services called at Golborne in each direction on Mondays to Saturdays, most were local services. Southbound they mostly started from Wigan, the first train, the 0628, began at Preston and the 0710 started from Golborne itself. There were two Sunday services in each direction.

Post L&NWR to station closure

The station was renamed Golborne South on 1 January 1949 to avoid confusion with the close by ex-Great Central/LNER Golborne North station. The station closed to passengers on 6 February 1961 and to goods traffic on 22 May 1967.

The line after the station closed
Local passenger traffic ceased between Crewe and Preston via Earlestown on 6 October 1969.

The lines through the station site were electrified as part of the West Coast Main Line (WCML) modernisation in 1974.

The lines through the station site are still open in 2021.  The former Labour Leigh MP, Jo Platt backs plans to reopen this closed station, as does the Conservative Leigh MP  James Grundy and also Boris Johnson backs the scheme.

References

Notes

Citations

Sources

Further reading

External links

 Both Golborne stations on an Edwardian 25" OS map National Library of Scotland
 Golborne station via Wigan World
 Golborne station on a 1948 OS Map via npe Maps
 Golborne station via Disused Stations UK

Former North Union Railway stations
Railway stations in Great Britain opened in 1839
Railway stations in Great Britain closed in 1961
Disused railway stations in the Metropolitan Borough of Wigan
Demolished buildings and structures in Greater Manchester